Kristina Krstic (born 15 June 1994) is an Australian international lawn bowler. She represented Australia at the 2022 Commonwealth Games, where she won a gold medal in the pairs.

Personal life
Krstic attended Mount Lawley Senior High School from 2007 to 2011.

Bowls career
Krstic, a chiropractor, started bowling at age 10 and won multiple titles at the junior level. She came to prominence after winning the silver medal in the pairs with Karen Murphy at the 2015 Hong Kong International Bowls Classic. She has won four Australian National Bowls Championships medals and four Australian open medals.

In 2022, Krstic competed in the women's pairs and the women's fours at the 2022 Commonwealth Games in Birmingham. In the pairs even, with Ellen Ryan, she won the gold medal, defeating England in a tie break final that went down to the last shot of the game.

References

1994 births
Living people
Australian female bowls players
20th-century Australian women
21st-century Australian women
Bowls players at the 2022 Commonwealth Games
Commonwealth Games gold medallists for Australia
Commonwealth Games medallists in lawn bowls
Medallists at the 2022 Commonwealth Games